In September 2016, the International Union for Conservation of Nature (IUCN) listed 879 vulnerable mollusc species. Of all evaluated mollusc species, 12% are listed as vulnerable. 
The IUCN also lists 18 mollusc subspecies as vulnerable.

No subpopulations of molluscs have been evaluated by the IUCN.

For a species to be assessed as vulnerable to extinction the best available evidence must meet quantitative criteria set by the IUCN designed to reflect "a high risk of extinction in the wild". Endangered and critically endangered species also meet the quantitative criteria of vulnerable species, and are listed separately. See: List of endangered molluscs, List of critically endangered molluscs. Vulnerable, endangered and critically endangered species are collectively referred to as threatened species by the IUCN.

Additionally 1988 mollusc species (27% of those evaluated) are listed as data deficient, meaning there is insufficient information for a full assessment of conservation status. As these species typically have small distributions and/or populations, they are intrinsically likely to be threatened, according to the IUCN. While the category of data deficient indicates that no assessment of extinction risk has been made for the taxa, the IUCN notes that it may be appropriate to give them "the same degree of attention as threatened taxa, at least until their status can be assessed".

This is a complete list of vulnerable mollusc species and subspecies evaluated by the IUCN.

Gastropods
There are 828 species and 16 subspecies of gastropod assessed as vulnerable.

Stylommatophora
Stylommatophora includes the majority of land snails and slugs. There are 339 species and six subspecies in the order Stylommatophora assessed as vulnerable.

Charopids

Helicarionids

Orthalicids

Euconulids

Streptaxids

Ferussaciids

Helminthoglyptids

Oxychilids

Camaenids

Lauriids

Vertiginids

Species

Subspecies
Anauchen informis informis
Anauchen informis parcedentata

Trissexodontids

Helicids
Species

Subspecies
Hemicycla glyceia silensis

Hygromiids
Species

Subspecies
Leptaxis simia portosancti

Vitrinids

Chondrinids

Enids

Other Stylommatophora
Species

Subspecies
Chlorilis hungerfordiana rufopila
Spelaeodiscus triarius tatricus

Littorinimorpha
There are 324 species and seven subspecies in the order Littorinimorpha assessed as vulnerable.

Hydrobiids
Species

Subspecies

Cochliopids

Bithyniids

Moitessieriids

Assimineids

Pomatiopsids

Amnicolids

Other Littorinimorpha species

Sorbeoconcha
There are 55 species in the order Sorbeoconcha assessed as vulnerable.

Pleurocerids

Melanopsids
Esperiana sangarica
Melanopsis subgraellsiana

Thiarids

Pachychilids

Paludomids

Architaenioglossa
Species

Subspecies
Renea moutonii moutonii
Renea moutonii singularis

Lower Heterobranchia species

Cycloneritimorpha

Hygrophila
Species

Subspecies
Gyraulus connollyi exilis

Neogastropoda

Conids

Eupulmonata
Zospeum biscaiense
Zospeum exiguum

Bivalvia
There are 49 species and two subspecies in the class Bivalvia assessed as vulnerable.

Unionida
There are 37 species and two subspecies in the order Unionoida assessed as vulnerable.

Margaritiferids
Middendorff's freshwater pearl mussel (Margaritifera middendorffi)

Unionids
Species

Subspecies
Lampsilis reeviana reeviana

Hyriids

Iridinids
Species

Subspecies
Chambardia wahlbergi guillaini

Mycetopodids
Diplodontites olssoni

Cardiida

Arcida
Scaphula nagarjunai

Venerida

Cephalopods
Opisthoteuthis calypso
Opisthoteuthis massyae

See also 
 Lists of IUCN Red List vulnerable species
 List of least concern molluscs
 List of near threatened molluscs
 List of endangered molluscs
 List of critically endangered molluscs
 List of recently extinct molluscs
 List of data deficient molluscs

References 

Molluscs
Vulnerable molluscs
Vulnerable molluscs